The 2006 Italian general election was the first in the country's history in which Italian and dual citizens living outside the country could vote by postal ballot in international electoral districts. Twelve members of the Italian Chamber of Deputies and six members of the Italian Senate were elected in this way.

Italian and dual citizens in North America and Central America (including the Caribbean) elected two members of the Italian Chamber of Deputies. The winning candidates were Gino Bucchino of Romano Prodi's election coalition, The Union, and Salvatore Ferrigno of Silvio Berlusconi's Forza Italia party.

The process
All electors could vote for a political list and also cast a first preference vote for a specific candidate. Parties were allotted seats via proportional representation, and the candidates that led the electoral slates that won seats were declared elected.

The parties
Seven electoral lists contested the North and Central American Senate division. The same lists also fielded candidates for the Chamber of Deputies and North and Central America.

Prime minister Silvio Berlusconi's right-wing Forza Italia party ran its own slate. Two other parties aligned with Berlusconi's government ran separate lists: the moderate conservative Union of Christian and Centre Democrats and Mirko Tremaglia's right-wing For Italy in the World, which was specifically focused on diaspora issues. (Another party in Berlusconi's coalition, the Northern League, also appeared on the ballot, although this seems to have been due to a technical error).

The main opposition group from the previous parliament, Romano Prodi's centre-left Union party, ran a united slate. One of the Union candidates noted that the state of the party lists favoured his group's chances of election.

The centrist Independent Alternative for Italians Abroad also fielded a list, as did the far-right Tricolour Flame party.

Each of the party lists comprised four candidates, except for the Northern League, which fielded three, and the Tricolour Flame, which fielded two.

The results
Romano Prodi's Union received the most votes and won the first seat. Forza Italia finished second and was awarded the second seat.

Detailed results by country
More than 93 per cent of the total votes were cast in the United States of America or Canada. Forza Italia won a narrow victory in America, while the Union won a significant victory in Canada.

Antigua and Barbuda

Bahamas

Barbados

Belize

Canada

Costa Rica

Dominican Republic

El Salvador

Grenada

Guatemala

Haiti

Honduras

Mexico

Nicaragua

Panama

United States of America

Source: ARCHIVIO STORICO DELLE ELEZIONI - Consultazione dati: Camera 09/04/2006, Area ESTERO, Ripartizione AMERICA SETTENTRIONALE E CENTRALE, Ministerio dell'Interno, Government of Italy, accessed 27 July 2011.

References

2006 elections in Italy